Hyp or HYP may refer to:

 Big Three (colleges), collectively Harvard, Yale, and Princeton Universities
 Hungry Young Poets, a Philippine rock band
 Hydroxyproline, an amino acid
 Hypothetical mood in grammar
 People's Ascent Party, a political party in Turkey
 Hyp, a character in The Land Before Time series